A ring is said to be a Dedekind-finite ring if ab = 1 implies ba = 1 for any two ring elements a and b. In other words, all one-sided inverses in the ring are two-sided.

These rings have also been called directly finite rings and von Neumann finite rings.

Properties 

 If a ring is finite, then it is Dedekind-finite.
 Any subring of a Dedekind-finite ring is Dedekind-finite.
 If a ring is a domain then it is Dedekind-finite.
 Any left Noetherian ring is Dedekind-finite.
 A unit-regular ring is Dedekind-finite.
 A local ring is Dedekind-finite.

References

See also 

 Dedekind-infinite set
 Von Neumann regular ring

Ring theory